Aboriginella is an extinct genus of brachiopods found in Aksayan to Batyrbaian strata in Kazakhstan. It was a facultatively mobile infaunal suspension feeder.

References 

Lingulata
Prehistoric brachiopod genera